Idzega is a small village in Súdwest-Fryslân municipality in the province Friesland of the Netherlands. It had a population of around 30 in January 2017.

History
The village was first mentioned in 1245 as Edeswald, and means "settlement of Iddo or Ede (person)". Idzega is an agricultural community from the middle ages, and used to surrounded by lakes and pools. Nowadays, the village is located on a dead-end road next to the Idzegaasterpoel.

The bell tower was built in 1826. Idzega was home to 149 people in 1840. Before 2011, the village was part of the Wymbritseradiel municipality.

References

External links

Súdwest-Fryslân
Populated places in Friesland